Onchidium reevesii is a species of air-breathing sea slug, a shell-less marine pulmonate gastropod mollusk in the family Onchidiidae. It is one of four recognized species in the genus Onchidium.

Distribution
Onchidium reevesii is known only from the coast of China and Hong Kong.

Description
The Onchidium reevesii can be found living in the intertidal zone near mangroves in the subtropical waters of China.

References

Onchidiidae
Gastropods described in 1850
Taxa named by John Edward Gray